Selaine Rachel Saxby (born 25 November 1970) is a British Conservative Party politician who has been the Member of Parliament (MP) for North Devon since the 2019 general election. She is also a councillor on North Devon Council.

Early life
Saxby was born in Coventry in the West Midlands in November 1970 to Kenneth and Pamela Saxby. Her father is a former headteacher.

She attended Eastbourne Sixth Form College, before studying mathematics and management at Magdalene College, Cambridge, where she gained a BA First Class Honours degree in Maths and Management Studies in 1992.

She founded the independent sports bra retailer Lessbounce Ltd. in 2000, and ran the business until 2016, when it went into liquidation. During this period, she was one of the signatories to a letter of support from small business owners endorsing the Conservatives at the 2015 general election.

Saxby also founded Pink Aerobics, which organised aerobics events to raise money for breast cancer charities; it raised over £500,000. She was the chief of staff for Bath MP Ben Howlett between 2015 and 2017. From 2017 to 2018, she was a Business Support Consultant.

Parliamentary career
Saxby stood as the Conservative Party candidate for Llanelli at the 2015 general election, traditionally a safe seat for the Labour Party. She finished in fourth place behind the Labour, Plaid Cymru, and UKIP candidates.

In May 2019, Saxby was elected to represent Instow ward on North Devon Council. She was selected as the Conservative candidate for North Devon on 11 November 2019, and was elected as MP for the constituency at the 2019 general election with a majority of 14,813 (26.6%). Saxby is the first female MP for the constituency. She has been a member of the Work and Pensions Select Committee since March 2020.

In October 2020, following a vote in Parliament against a Labour Party Opposition Day Motion to extend free school meals over holidays, Saxby was criticised for stating in a Facebook post that she hoped if local businesses were able to offer free food, then they would not be seeking further government help. She later deleted her Facebook post, stating her comments had been taken "out of context". She said in a statement that she regretted any offence that "may have been caused", and also criticised "a small but hostile element" on social media who she said had been "aggressive and personally abusive" towards her and her staff.

On 13 June 2022, Saxby was appointed Parliamentary Private Secretary to Simon Clarke, the chief secretary to the Treasury; she resigned from the role on 6 July 2022, in connection with the resignations of Rishi Sunak and Sajid Javid over Prime Minister Boris Johnson's handling of the Chris Pincher scandal.

In the October 2022 Conservative Party leadership election, Saxby supported Rishi Sunak.

Personal life 
Saxby lists her recreations in Who's Who as "surfing, gig rowing, cycling, running, walking George my labrador".

References

External links

1970 births
Living people
Alumni of Magdalene College, Cambridge
UK MPs 2019–present
Conservative Party (UK) MPs for English constituencies
21st-century British women politicians
British businesspeople in retailing
Schoolteachers from Devon
Conservative Party (UK) councillors
Councillors in Devon
Female members of the Parliament of the United Kingdom for English constituencies
Members of the Parliament of the United Kingdom for constituencies in Devon
Politicians from Coventry
Schoolteachers from the West Midlands
21st-century English women
21st-century English people
Women councillors in England